The GCC Champions League, is an annually organized football league tournament for club of the Arabian Peninsula.

The 2016 edition was set to be the 31st edition.

On August 6, 2015 it was announced that the competition would be postponed until February 2016 due to the suspension of Kuwait from FIFA. Later in January 2016 it was announced that the competition would not take place at all due to a lack of sponsorship. The next edition would therefore be held in 2017.

Teams

Group stage
The group stage was drawn before the tournament got cancelled.

Group A
 Al-Jahra
 Manama
 Al-Nasr
 Al-Ahli
Group B
 Al-Arabi
 Al-Fateh
 Baniyas
 Al-Arabi
Group C
 Al-Wasl
 Al-Hidd
 Sur
 Al-Faisaly

External links
Official website
Season at soccerway.com

References

2016
2016 in Asian football
Cancelled association football competitions